Hammadi Agrebi Stadium, opened as Stade 7 November, is a multi-purpose stadium in Radès, Tunis, Tunisia about 10 kilometers south-east of downtown Tunis, in the center of the Olympic City. It is currently used mostly for football matches and it also has facilities for athletics.  The stadium has a capacity of up to 60,000 spectators and was built in 2001 for the 2001 Mediterranean Games. The stadium is considered to be one of the best stadiums in Africa.

History

It was inaugurated in July 2001 for the final of the Tunisian Cup between CS Hammam-Lif and Étoile du Sahel (1-0).

Club Africain and Espérance de Tunis play their major league matches here. Before the construction of this stadium, the Tunis derby used to be played in the 45,000 seat-capacity Stade El Menzah. It is also the main stadium of the Tunisia national football team.

This stadium hosted matches of the 2004 African Cup of Nations which was won by Tunisia.

The 2010 Trophée des Champions between Olympique de Marseille and Paris Saint-Germain took place at the stadium on 28 July 2010. The two teams drew 0-0 in the presence of 57,000 spectators.

Certificate
The stadium has an IAAF Class 1 Certificate, which means that the stadium meets the best standards and qualities in its field.

Name

At the time of its creation, the stadium was named 7 November Stadium, the date that Zine El Abidine Ben Ali assumed the Presidency on 7 November 1987 in a bloodless coup d'état that ousted President Habib Bourguiba. But, following his ousting in 2011, it took the name of the Stade Olympique de Radès.

In August 2020, following the death of Hammadi Agrebi, Prime Minister Elyes Fakhfakh renamed the stadium in his name. This announcement surprises the mayor of Radès who indicates that the municipal council will meet to make a decision. But, the Ministry of Local Affairs responds that the stadium is placed under the direction of the Ministry of Youth and Sports and not under the direction of the municipality of Radès, so the name of the stadium is officially changed. The municipality of Rades did not raise the issue again, as the Tunisian Football Federation, the Confederation of African Football and FIFA started using the new name for the stadium, which made it the usual name since then.

Gallery

See also
 Salle Omnisport de Rades

References

External links
Photos at cafe.daum.net/stade
Soccerway Profile
World Stadiums Article
StadiumDB images

Football venues in Tunisia
Sport in Radès
Club Africain
Espérance Sportive de Tunis